Gut Me Like an Animal is the debut extended play (EP) by English singer-songwriter duo Ider, released on 31 March 2017 through Aesop. This was the band's only release with Aesop.

Background
Having already released EPs as "Lily and Meg", Gut Me Like An Animal was Markwick and Somerville's first EP release as Ider. Prior to this EP's release, they had released four songs as Ider. Musically, Gut Me Like An Animal is a synth pop record.

Track list

References

Ider (band) albums
2017 debut EPs